= Shakthiveda Bhaishajya Mahayagam =

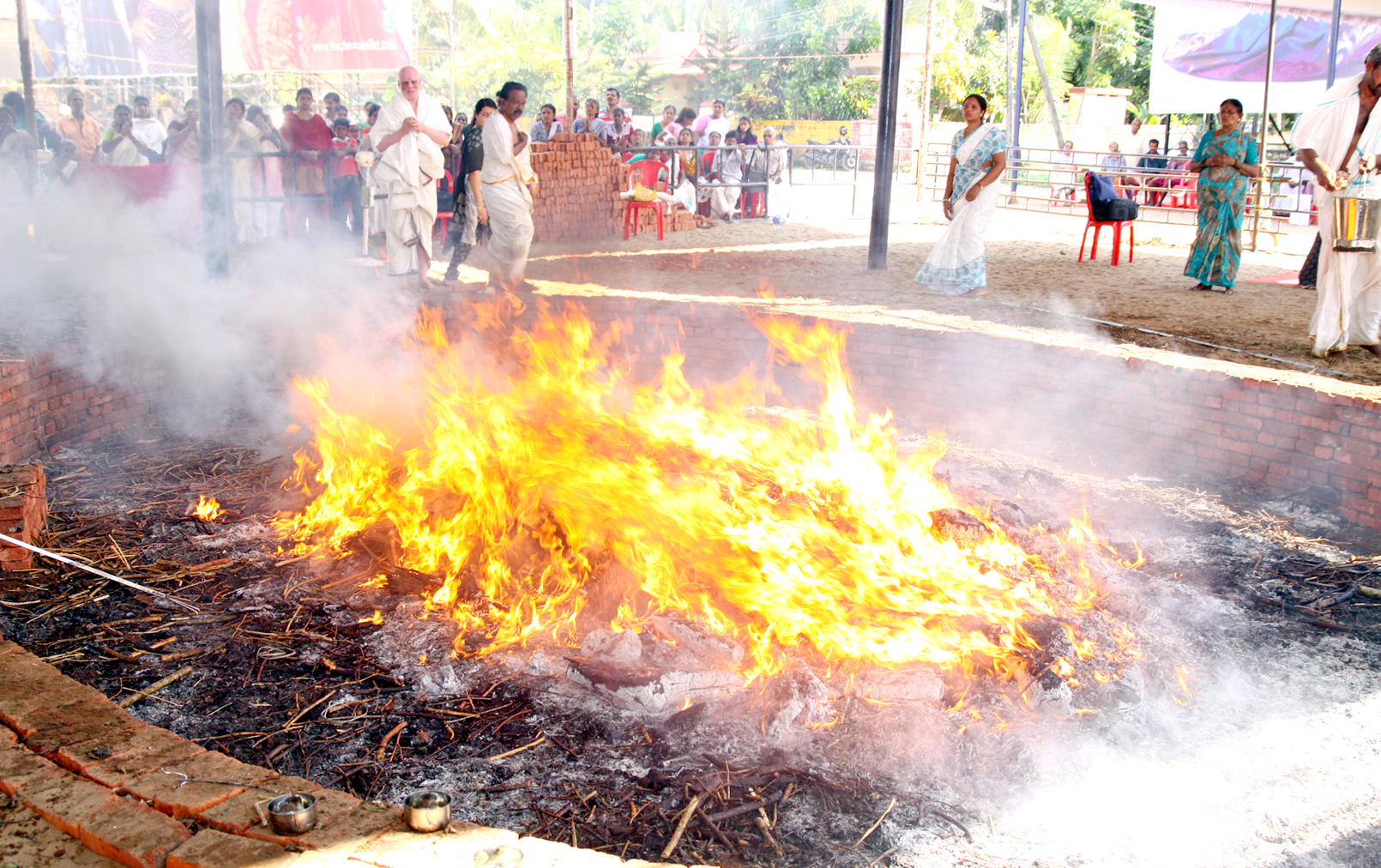
Maha Yajnakunda of Bhaishajya Maha Yagam

Shakthiveda Bhaishajya Mahayagam is a global Yaga organized by Shakthiveda Wellness Mission, a Registered Charitable Trust. The 4th Bhaishajya Mahayagam was scheduled to be conducted in Bommandahalli, Bangalore from 20 to 23 February 2014. The Mahayagam is a chain of 81 episodes, performed non-stop for 81 hours covering 3 nights and 4 days.

== Bhaishajya Mahayagam Focal Issues ==
81 focal issues of Bhaishajya Mahayagam are given below

Hourly module	Focal Theme
1	Adulteration
2	Alcoholism
3	Anger, Wrath, Jealousy, Greed, Gluttony, Sloth, Pride, Hypocrisy
4	Arms race
5	Atheism
6	Atrocities on women
7	Bribery
8	Beggary
9	Blockages in Life
10	Breach of Promise
11	Business Failure
12	Child Abuse
13	Cleansing the Environment
14	Communal Disharmony
15	Contamination of Panchabhoothas
16	Corruption in General
17	Cheating, lying and treachery
18	Culpable homicide
19	Discrimination against women
20	Destruction of Evil Symbols
21	Divorce
22	Diseases
23	Ecological imbalance
24	Enmity between various religions
25	Excessive Sexual desire in children
26	Fatal Accidents
27	Geocide (Killing of soil using synthetic and chemical fertilizers)
28	Global economic crisis
29	Global unrest
30	Hunger
31	Ignorance about the subtle aspects of physical body and life
32	Injustice
33	Juvenile delinquency
34	Interstate disputes
35	Lack of confidence
36	Low agricultural productivity
37	Lethargy
38	Malpractices in worship, superstitions and pseudo spirituality
39	Manias
40	Mental derangement and suicide
41	Misappropriation of resources
42	Misfortune
43	Misuse of science and technology
44	Misuse of mass media, art and literature
45	Misuse of time and money
46	Money lending
47	Natural calamities
48	Negativities in Currency
49	Overpopulation
50	Panchabhootha related Diseases
51	Phobias
52	Political Opportunism
53	Political and Economic Corruption
54	Famine and premature death
55	Price rise of gold and essential goods
56	Spiritual healing problems
57	Racism and casteism
58	Rape, Sexual offenses and perversions
59	Religious Fanaticism
60	Removing blockages for developing outstanding citizens of building up a great nation
61	Robbing of public treasury
62	Social and family break down
63	Spiritual (Theosoulistic) distortions
64	Satanic worship and witchcraft
65	Sorcery
66	Street children
67	Stress and tension
68	Terrorism
69	Threat from neighbouring countries
70	Torturing others
71	Theft and robbery
72	Transplantation of human organs without the knowledge of the victim
73	Unemployment
74	Unethical medical practices
75	Unethical energy in places of worship
76	Unethical political practices
77	Violation of human rights
78	Violation of law of nature
79	Water pollution
80	War
81	Zero tolerance

== Photo gallery ==
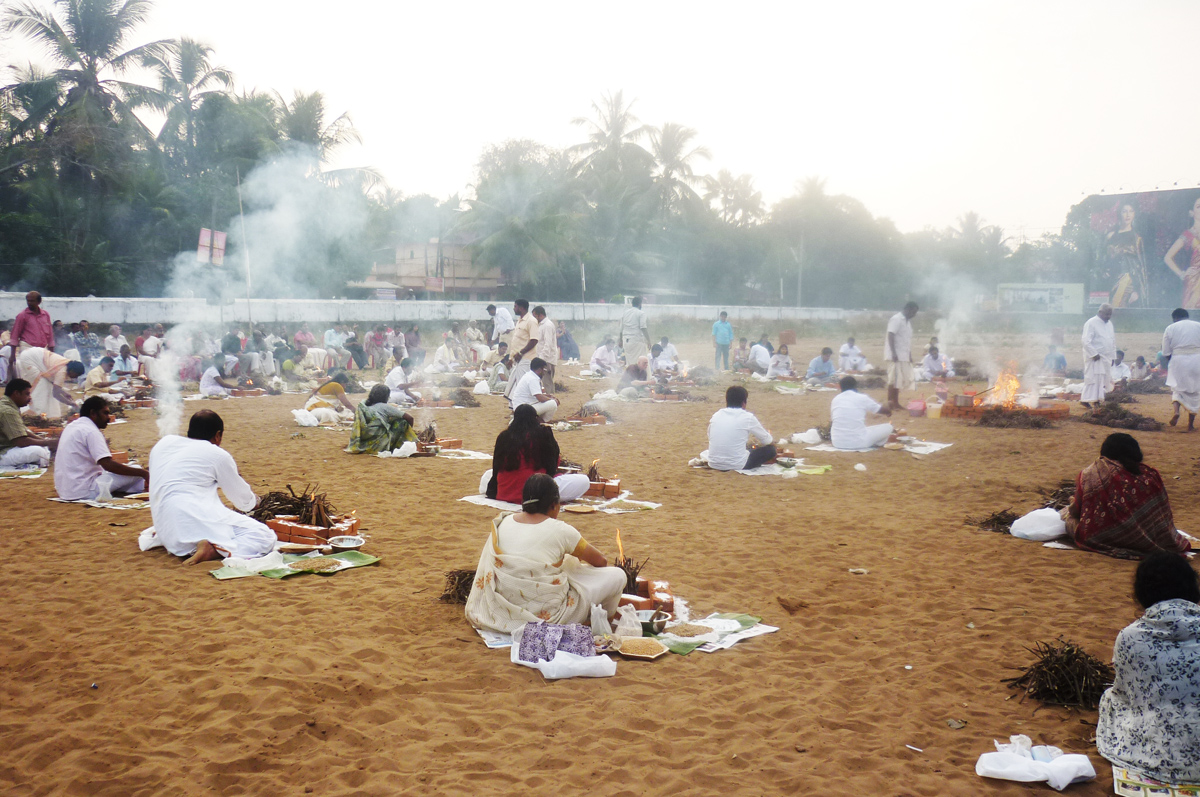
Mahashakthi Ganesha Homa

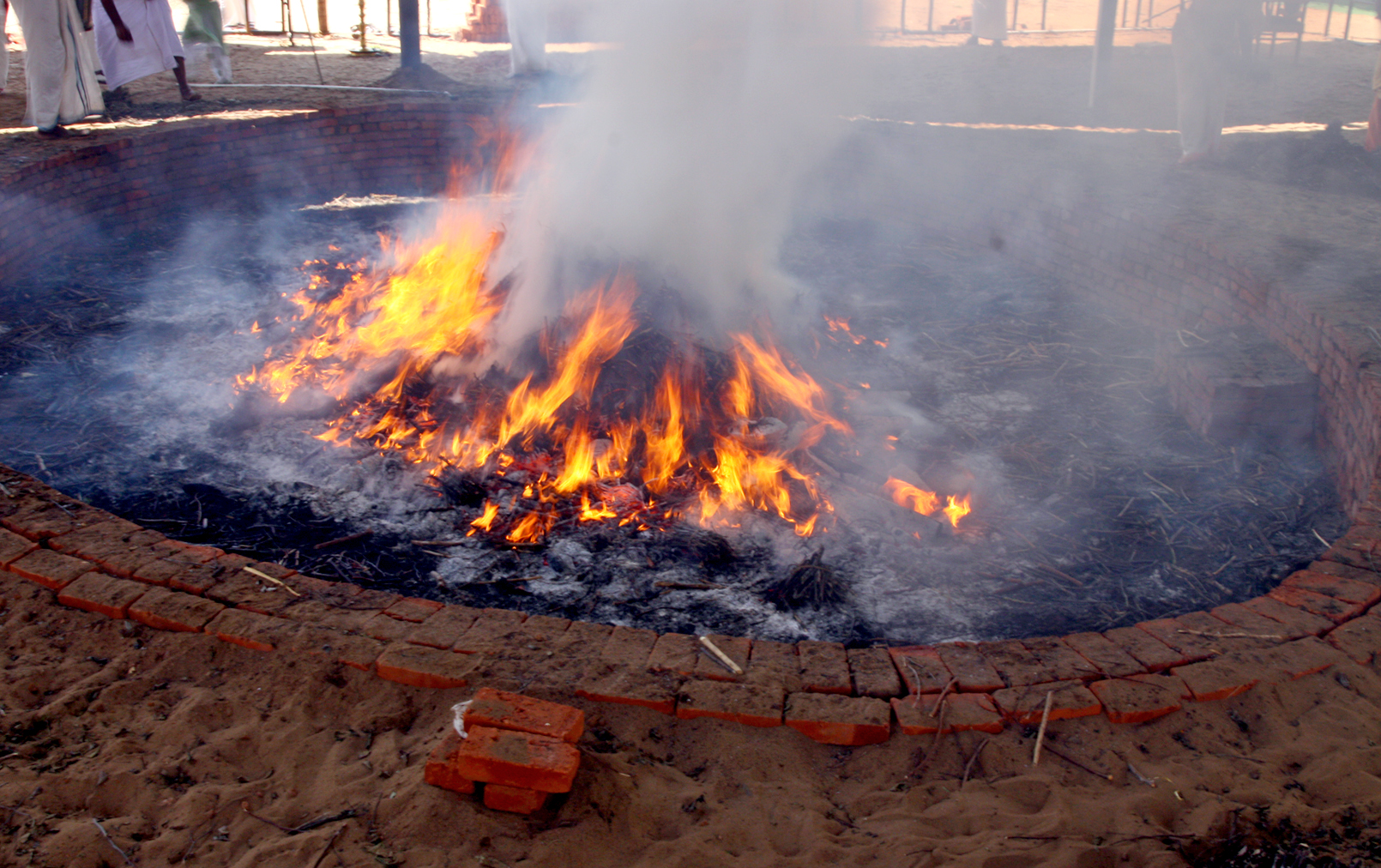
Maha Yajnakunda

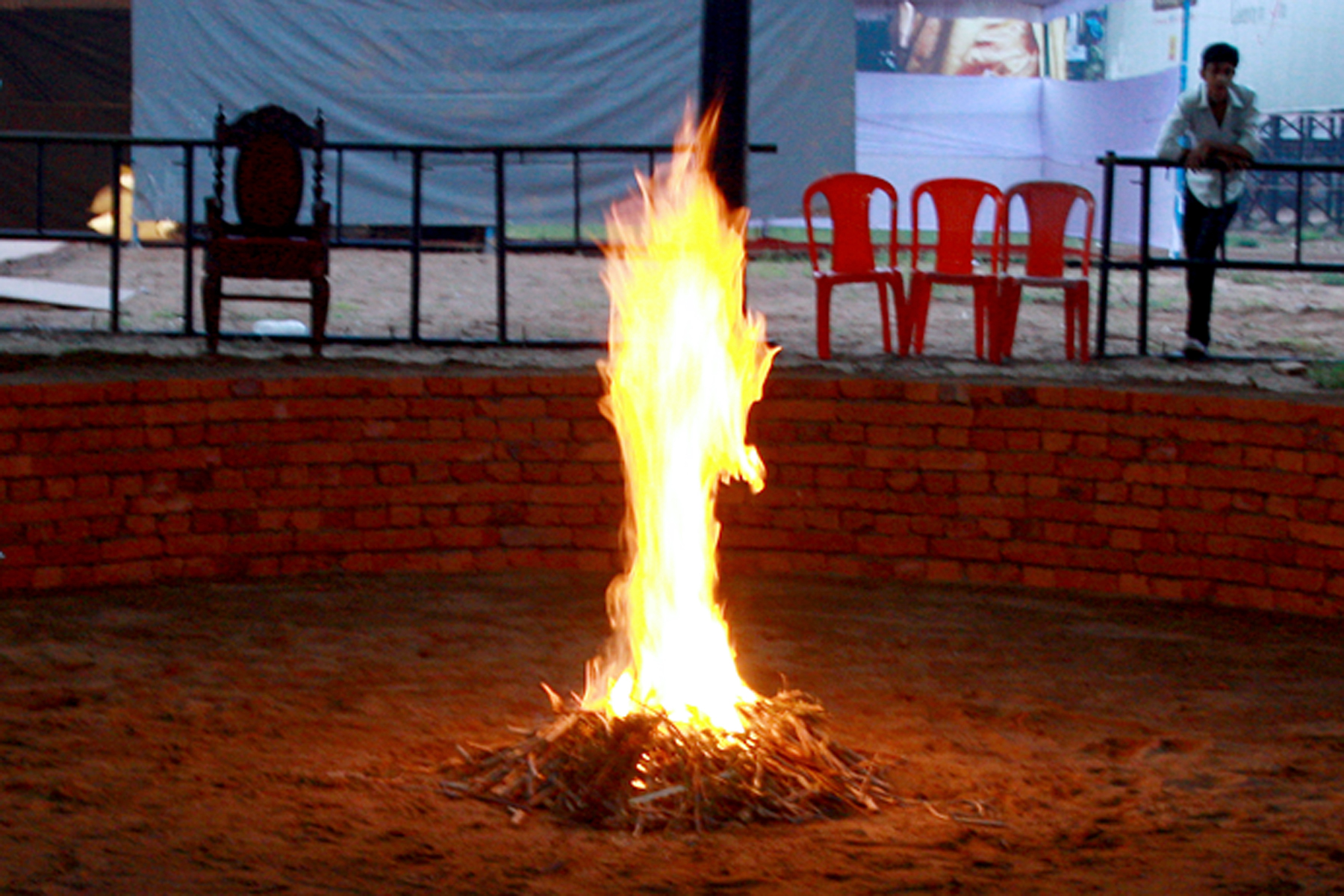
Holy fire of Vishwa Shanthi Maha Yajnam
